DVT most commonly refers to deep vein thrombosis, the formation of a blood clot in a deep vein, most commonly in the legs.

DVT may also refer to:

 D. Vt., a short form for the United States District Court for the District of Vermont
 Design verification test, for quality control in engineering
 Driving Van Trailer, a railway vehicle
 DVT, IATA code for Phoenix Deer Valley Airport, Arizona, US